Macarostola is a genus of moths in the family Gracillariidae. The genus was erected by Edward Meyrick in 1907.

Characteristics: Characters of Gracilaria, but middle tibiae not thickened, smooth-scaled, scales sometimes expanded at apex only.

Species
Macarostola ageta (Turner, 1917)
Macarostola callischema Meyrick, 1908
Macarostola ceryx (Diakonoff, 1955)
Macarostola coccinea (Walsingham, 1900)
Macarostola eugeniella (Viette, 1951)
Macarostola flora (Meyrick, 1926)
Macarostola formosa (Stainton, 1862)
Macarostola gamelia (Meyrick, 1936)
Macarostola haemataula Meyrick, 1912
Macarostola hieranthes (Meyrick, 1907)
Macarostola ida (Meyrick, 1880)
Macarostola japonica Kumata, 1977
Macarostola miltopepla (Turner, 1926)
Macarostola miniella (Felder & Rogenhofer, 1875)
Macarostola noellineae Vári, 2002
Macarostola paradisia Meyrick, 1908
Macarostola parolca Meyrick, 1911
Macarostola phoenicaula (Meyrick, 1934)
Macarostola polyplaca (Lower, 1894)
Macarostola pontificalis (Meyrick, 1928)
Macarostola pyrelictis (Meyrick, 1927)
Macarostola rosacea (Turner, 1940)
Macarostola tegulata Meyrick, 1908
Macarostola thiasodes (Meyrick, 1912)
Macarostola thriambica (Meyrick, 1907)
Macarostola zehntneri (Snellen, 1902)

References

External links
Global Taxonomic Database of Gracillariidae (Lepidoptera)

 
Gracillariinae
Gracillarioidea genera